Waldemar Eric Metzenthin (February 24, 1875 – September 18, 1942) was a German American scholar and college sports coach and administrator. He served as professor of German studies at the University of Texas at Austin. He also coached the Texas Longhorns football team and men's basketball team from 1907 to 1908 and 1909 to 1911, respectively, and served as the athletic director at Texas from 1930 to 1935.

Metzenthin was born in Berlin in February 24, 1875. He attended Franklin & Marshall College in Lancaster, Pennsylvania, where he played college football. He earned a Master of Arts degree from Columbia University in 1906. Metzenthin came to the University of Texas in 1906 as an assistant football coach. The following year, he was appointed adjunct professor of Germanic languages, head football coach, and director of physical training. Metzenthin also taught at Southern Methodist University (SMU) from 1919 to 1922, Baylor University School of Dentistry—now known as Texas A&M University College of Dentistry—from 1922 to 1923, and North Texas State Teachers College—now known as the University of North Texas—from 1923 to 1928. He subsequently returned to the University of Texas as a full professor and was named chair of the school's department of Germanic languages in 1941. Metzenthin died after suffering a stroke on September 18, 1942, at Seton Hospital in Austin, Texas.

Head coaching record

Football

Basketball

References

External links
 

1875 births
1942 deaths
19th-century players of American football
American football quarterbacks
Columbia Lions football players
Franklin & Marshall Diplomats football players
Southern Methodist University faculty
Texas Longhorns football coaches
Texas Longhorns men's basketball coaches
Texas Longhorns athletic directors
University of North Texas faculty
University of Texas at Austin faculty
Professors of German in the United States
University of Texas at Austin Department of German faculty
Sportspeople from Berlin
German emigrants to the United States